Teenage Scream is the debut full-length studio album by American electronicore band That's Outrageous!. The album was released on July 19, 2011, through Rise Records.

Track listing

Personnel
 That's Outrageous!
 Doriano Magliano – unclean vocals
 Tom DeGrazia – clean vocals, synthesizers, keyboards
 David Newton – guitar
 Joe Jensen – guitar
 Greg Adams – bass guitar
 Max Wyre – drums

 Other Personnel
 Austin Carlile (Of Mice & Men) – additional vocals on "The New York Chainsaw Massacre"

 Production
 Cameron Mizell – Producer, Mixing, Mastering, engineer

References

2011 debut albums
That's Outrageous! albums
Rise Records albums
Albums produced by Cameron Mizell